Single-level storage (SLS) or single-level memory is a computer storage term which has had two meanings. The two meanings are related in that in both, pages of memory may be in primary storage (RAM) or in secondary storage (disk), and that the physical location of a page is unimportant to a process.

The term originally referred to what is now usually called virtual memory, which was introduced in 1962 by the Atlas system at the University of Manchester.

In modern usage, the term usually refers to the organization of a computing system in which there are no files, only persistent objects (sometimes called segments), which are mapped into processes' address spaces (which consist entirely of a collection of mapped objects). The entire storage of the computer is thought of as a single two-dimensional plane of addresses (segment, and address within segment).

The persistent object concept was first introduced by Multics in the mid-1960s, in a project shared by MIT, General Electric and Bell Labs. It also was implemented as virtual memory, with the actual physical implementation including a number of levels of storage types. (Multics, for instance, had three levels originally: main memory, a high-speed drum, and disks.)

IBM holds patents to single-level storage as implemented in the IBM i operating system on IBM Power Systems and its predecessors as far back as the System/38 that was released in 1978.

Design 

With a single-level storage the entire storage of a computer is thought of as a single two-dimensional plane of addresses, pointing to pages. Pages may be in primary storage (RAM) or in secondary storage (disk); however, the current location of an address is unimportant to a process. The operating system takes on the responsibility of locating pages and making them available for processing. If a page is in primary storage, it is immediately available. If a page is on disk, a page fault occurs and the operating system brings the page into primary storage. No explicit I/O to secondary storage is done by processes: instead, reads from secondary storage are done as the result of page faults; writes to secondary storage are done when pages that have been modified since being read from secondary storage into primary storage are written back to their location in secondary storage.

System/38 and IBM i design

IBM's design of the single-level storage was originally conceived and pioneered by Frank Soltis and Glenn Henry in the late 1970s as a way to build a transitional implementation to computers with 100% solid state memory. The thinking at the time was that disk drives would become obsolete, and would be replaced entirely with some form of solid state memory. System/38 was designed to be independent of the form of hardware memory used for secondary storage. This has not come to be, however, because while solid state memory has become exponentially cheaper, disk drives have also become similarly cheaper; thus, the price ratio in favour of disk drives continues: very much higher capacities than solid state memory, very much slower to access, and much less expensive.

In System/38 and IBM i, all data in storage is assigned a address, accessible by processor instructions, in virtual memory, and is referred to by that address, regardless of whether it is currently in physical memory or not.  If the data referred to by that address is not in physical memory, a page fault occurs.  The page fault is handled by low-level software that reads the page into an available page frame in primary storage.

With the IBM i implementation of single-level storage, page faults are divided into two categories. These are database faults and non-database faults. Database faults occur when a page associated with a relational database object like a table, view or index is not currently in primary storage. Non-database faults occur when any other type of object is not currently in primary storage.

See also 

 System/38
 IBM i
 Extremely Reliable Operating System
 Memory-mapped file

References 

IBM i
AS/400